Plutella psammochroa is a moth of the family Plutellidae first described by Edward Meyrick in 1885. It is found in New Zealand.  The classification of this moth within the genus Plutella is regarded as unsatisfactory and in need of revision. As such this species is currently also known as Plutella (s.l.) psammochroa.

References

Plutellidae
Moths of New Zealand
Moths described in 1885
Endemic fauna of New Zealand
Taxa named by Edward Meyrick
Endemic moths of New Zealand